When Rover Met BMW is a 5-part documentary series produced by the BBC in 1996. German motor company BMW had bought Rover in 1994 and the series follows the sometimes fraught relationship between the two. Episode one, Don't Mention The War, covers the launch of the Rover 200, analyses the press coverage this generated and also shows the reaction to BMW's appointment of a new chairman for Rover. The title of the first episode is a Basil Fawlty quote from the comedy series Fawlty Towers. By the final episode, Undercover Operations, Rover's chief executive, John Towers, has resigned and BMW have reshuffled the Rover board.

List of episodes
Don't Mention The War (first broadcast 5 November 1996)
Identity Crisis (first broadcast 12 November 1996)
A Job For Life (first broadcast 19 November 1996)
Bonding (first broadcast 26 November 1996)
Undercover Operations (first broadcast 3 December 1996)

References

Rover Company
BMW
1996 documentary films
Documentary films about the automotive industry
BBC television documentaries